Blackmagic Fusion (formerly eyeon Fusion and briefly Maya Fusion, a version produced for Alias-Wavefront) is post-production image compositing developed by Blackmagic Design and originally authored by eyeon Software. It is typically used to create visual effects and digital compositing for movies, TV-series and commercials and employs a node-based interface in which complex processes are built up by connecting a flowchart or schematic of many nodes, each of which represents a simpler process, such as a blur or color correction. This type of compositing interface allows great flexibility, including the ability to modify the parameters of an earlier image processing step "in context" (while viewing the final composite). Upon its acquisition by Blackmagic Design, Fusion was released in two versions: the freeware Fusion, and the commercially sold Fusion Studio.

Fusion is available for Linux, Microsoft Windows, and with the release of Fusion 8, macOS.

History 
Fusion was originally developed in 1987 as in-house software developed for use by New York Production & Design (NYPD), a post production and visual effects boutique based out of Sydney, Australia. The very first version of the software was written in DOS and consisted of little more than a UI framework for quickly chaining together the output of pre-existing batch files and utilities. eyeon Software Inc. was formed specifically to commercialize Fusion, and all operations relating to the software were moved to Toronto, Ontario, Canada.

In 2014, Blackmagic Design acquired eyeon Software Inc, and is now developing the Fusion software.

Released in 2018, version 15 of DaVinci Resolve, also developed by Blackmagic Design, added an integrated version of Fusion within the application.

Version history

Uses 
Fusion has been used on over 1000 major Hollywood blockbuster feature films as of 2015 as well as on many TV shows, among them:

Fusion has also been used in video games such as Halo 5: Guardians, Destiny: Rise of Iron and Dawn of War III.

References

External links 
 Official Fusion Product Page
 We Suck Less - Forum Fusion Community

Compositing software
Lua (programming language)-scriptable software
MacOS graphics-related software
Software derived from or incorporating Wine
Windows graphics-related software